Receiving may refer to:

 Kabbalah, "receiving" in Hebrew
 Receiving department (or receiving dock), in a distribution center
 Receiving house, a theater
 Receiving line, in a wedding reception
 Receiving mark, postmark
 Receiving partner, in various sexual positions
 Receiving quarter, in military law
 Receiving ship, a ship used in harbor to house newly recruited sailors before they are assigned to a crew
 Receiving stolen goods, a crime in some jurisdictions

See also
 
 
 Accept (disambiguation)
 Receive (disambiguation)
 Reception (disambiguation)